Pırnallı is a village in the Artvin District of Artvin Province, Turkey. Its population is 137 (2021).

References

Villages in Artvin District